Gora and Badal are legendary Rajput warriors, whose story appears in the medieval Indian texts Padmavat (1540 CE), Gora Badal Padmini Chaupai (1589 CE), and their later adaptions. They served the king of Chittor, Ratansen (identified with Ratnasimha, also called Ratan Singh in later legends). Alauddin Khalji of Delhi attacked Chittor to obtain Ratansen's wife Padmavati and captured the king. Gora, Badal, and their soldiers entered Delhi disguised as Padmini and her companions, and rescued the king. Gora died fighting in this campaign, while Badal escorted the king to Chittor.

Padmavat 

In Malik Muhammad Jayasi's Padmavat (1540 CE), Gora and Badal are vassals of Ratansen, the king of Chittor (identified with Ratnasimha). Alauddin Khalji of Delhi attacks Chittor to obtain Ratansen's beautiful wife Padmavati. During a peace negotiation, Ratansen invites Alauddin as a guest inside the  fort, against the advice of Gora and Badal. Alauddin deceitfully catches a glimpse of Padmavati, captures Ratansen, and returns to Delhi. Padmavati asks Gora and Badal to help her free Ratansen. The two men and their followers enter the fortress of Delhi, disguised as Padmavati and her companions. They free Ratansen, but Gora is killed fighting during the escape, while Badal takes Ratansen to Chittor.

Gora Badal Padmini Chaupai 

Hemratan's Gora Badal Padmini Chaupai (1589 CE) follows a similar plot: Alauddin invades Chittor to obtain Ratan Sen's wife Padmini, and deceitfully captures Ratan Sen. The frightened nobles of Chittor consider surrendering Padmini to Alauddin. But warriors Gora (or Goru) and Badal (or Badil) agree to defend her and rescue king Ratansen. They pretend to make arrangements to bring Padmavati to Alauddin's camp, but instead bring warriors concealed in palanquins. They rescue the king; Gora dies fighting Alauddin's army, while Badal escorts the king back to the Chittor fort. Gora's wife commits self-immolation (sati). In heaven, Gora is rewarded with half of Indra's throne.

References

Bibliography 

 

History of Rajasthan
People from Rajasthan
Duos